Tom Feeney (born 1974) is an Irish former hurler who played as a full-back for the Waterford senior team.

Feeney joined the team during the 1993-94 National League and was a regular member of the starting fifteen until his retirement after the 2008 championship. During that time he won one Munster winners' medal. Feeney ended up as an All-Ireland runner-up on one occasion.

At club level Feeney is a one-time county championship medalist with Ballyduff Upper. He also played with the Sarsfields in Cork.

Playing career

Club
Feeney played his club hurling with the Ballyduff Upper club in Waterford.

In 2007 he lined out in the final of the county championship with Ballygunner providing the opposition. A 1-18 to 1-14 victory gave Feeney a Waterford Senior Hurling Championship medal.

Feeney also spent one season with the Sarsfields club in Cork.

Inter-county
Feeney first came to prominence on the inter-county scene as a member of the Waterford minor hurling team. In 1992 he won a Munster medal in that grade following a two-game series with Tipperary.  Waterford later qualified for the All-Ireland final, but Galway had a 1-13 to 2-4 victory.

Feeney made his senior debut for Waterford in a National Hurling League game against Wexford in 1993.

In 2002 Waterford reached the Munster final. Feeney collected a Munster medal that year as Waterford beat Tipperary by 2-23 to 3-12. It was their first provincial win in thirty-nine years. Waterford's championship came to an end in the All-Ireland semi-final.

Feeney was a regular at full-back by this stage, however, he missed out on Waterford's Munster triumph in 2004 and their National League success in 2007.

2008 Began poorly for Waterford as the team lost their opening game to Clare as well as their manager Justin McCarthy. In spite of this start, Feeney's side reached the All-Ireland final for the first time in forty-five years. Kilkenny provided the opposition and went on to defeat Waterford by 3-30 to 1-13 to claim a third All-Ireland title in-a-row.  Following this defeat, Feeney retired from his inter-county career.

Inter-provincial
Feeney was also a regular on the Munster team during a number of inter-provincial games.

Post-playing career
Feeney was appointed as a selector with Waterford ahead of the 2021 season in place of Stephen Molumphy, who left due to work commitments.

References

1974 births
Living people
Ballyduff Upper hurlers
Sarsfields (Cork) hurlers
Waterford inter-county hurlers
Munster inter-provincial hurlers
Hurling selectors